Nadolnik may refer to the following places:
Nadolnik, part of the Nowe Miasto district of Poznań
Nadolnik, Chodzież County in Greater Poland Voivodeship (west-central Poland)
Nadolnik, Kuyavian-Pomeranian Voivodeship (north-central Poland)
Nadolnik, Świętokrzyskie Voivodeship (south-central Poland)
Nadolnik, Kościan County in Greater Poland Voivodeship (west-central Poland)
Nadolnik, Leszno County in Greater Poland Voivodeship (west-central Poland)
Nadolnik, Szamotuły County in Greater Poland Voivodeship (west-central Poland)